Wenbin "Vincent" Ke  is a Canadian politician who has been the member of Provincial Parliament (MPP) for Don Valley North since June 7, 2018. Originally elected as a Progressive Conservative (PC), he stepped down from the caucus on March 10, 2023, following allegations of involvement in Chinese government election interference. He is the first mainland-Chinese Canadian immigrant elected as a PC MPP.

Background 
Ke was born in Quanzhou, Fujian, China, and immigrated to Canada in 1998. He holds an undergraduate degree in engineering from Fuzhou University in China and a Master's from Ruhr University in Germany. Prior to his election, Ke worked for Conec—a German firm which has sites in Shanghai and Brampton—from 1999 to 2018. His role with the company was as an electronic engineer. Ke is also registered as an insurance agent by the Financial Services Commission of Ontario.

Professional Engineers Ontario (PEO), the province's regulatory body for engineers, instructed Ke to stop using the title of engineer following complaints that he was doing so without being licensed as a professional engineer with PEO.

Political career 
Ke was elected to the Legislative Assembly following the 2018 provincial election. He was appointed as the parliamentary assistant to the minister of heritage, sport, tourism and culture industries (culture and sport) on June 26, 2019. On June 29, 2022, he was appointed as the parliamentary assistant to the minister of public and business service delivery.

Alleged Chinese government interference 

Ke's ties to the Chinese consulate were questioned by National Post writer Tom Blackwell in a 2019 article. In particular, Blackwell reported that Ke maintained ties with groups linked to the Chinese Communist Party's United Front Work Department. Blackwell provided Ke's office with a list of questions about his connections to the Chinese government including the possibility he joined the Chinese Communist Party, his ties with the Chinese consulate and a 2013 trip to China for a government-run workshop. In response, Ke's office said that he was "honoured to be a part of Doug Ford’s government" and that he would focus on "ensuring a strong voice for the constituents of Don Valley North at Queen’s Park". Premier Doug Ford's office also provided a response, stating that "MPP Ke is an important part of the Progressive Conservative caucus and represents his constituents with their best interests in mind".

In a 2021 article, Blackwell criticized Ke for seeming "over-eager to defend China, rather than being too worried about anti-Asian hate," after Ke and Scarborough—Agincourt MPP Aris Babikian spoke out about a sign at a Chinese physician's office describing COVID-19 as "Wuhan pneumonia" in Chinese.

On March 10, 2023, Global News reported that Ke served as a financial intermediary for the Chinese consulate as part of election interference efforts. Ke denied the allegations and resigned from the Ontario PC caucus on the same day, so that he would not be a "distraction to the government and take away from the good work Premier Ford is doing for the province of Ontario". Premier Ford's office stated that "While the allegations against Mr. Ke are not proven, they are serious and deserve his full and undivided attention as he works to clear his name".

Allowance from party donors 
During the 2022 provincial election, Ke and seven other PC MPPs were identified as having received an allowance from their PC riding associations, with Ke expensing meals, entertainment, gas and parking. While allowed by provincial law, federal politicians are prohibited from doing the same, raising questions about aligning provincial and federal allowance rules.

Electoral record

References

Notes 

Progressive Conservative Party of Ontario MPPs
21st-century Canadian politicians
Living people
Canadian politicians of Chinese descent
People from North York
Politicians from Toronto
Year of birth missing (living people)